"The Willows", also known as Randolph House, is a historic home located near Moorefield, Hardy County, West Virginia. It was built in three sections in a telescoping style. It consists of One small log house, a middle section of frame, and a brick mansion all connected end-to-end.  The oldest section is the -story log structure built before 1773.  The main section is a two-story, brick Greek Revival style mansion house.  It features a square columned entrance porch.  During the American Civil War, McNeill's Rangers used the farm for care of some of their horses.  In the last year of the War, McNeill's Rangers commander Major Harry Gilmore used "The Willows" as his command.

It was listed on the National Register of Historic Places in 1973.

References

American Civil War sites in West Virginia
Greek Revival houses in West Virginia
Hardy County, West Virginia in the American Civil War
Houses completed in 1850
Houses in Hardy County, West Virginia
Houses on the National Register of Historic Places in West Virginia
National Register of Historic Places in Hardy County, West Virginia